This is the list of governors of the Brazilian state of Amapá.

Elected governors 
Amapá has held direct elections for governor since 1990.

References 

Amapa
Governors of Amapá